Lawrence Kahn (born ) is an American tiddlywinks player. He is the most accomplished tiddlywinks player worldwide in terms of number of individual worldwide championships as well as number of pairs worldwide championships.

Biography
Larry Kahn grew up in North Miami Beach, Florida. He attended Massachusetts Institute of Technology (MIT) where he graduated with a bachelor's degree in ocean engineering in 1975. He would later receive a master's degree in the same field in 1976.

In 1984, he was an ocean engineer with Washington Analytical Services in Rockville, Maryland. As of 2016, he worked with the National Institutes of Health, advising them on IT acquisitions.

Tiddlywinks
Kahn first heard about the game tiddlywinks in 1971 from an MIT handbook sent to incoming students. By 1989, he was the vice president of the North American Tiddlywinks Association and additionally operated a tiddlywinks parlor in Maryland.
In the game, he has gone by the nickname "Horsemeat" and "King".

As of 2016, Kahn had won over 100 tiddlywinks championships, and held the Guinness World Record for most victories at the English National Championships (eight). As of 2013, he also held the Guinness World Records for "Most Tiddlywinks World Championships" with 21, and "Most Tiddlywinks World Championships (pairs)" with 16. Additionally, he was the only player to have held all six of the game's major titles simultaneously.
He has won five international titles competing as a duo with Dave Lockwood.

Lockwood and Kahn frequently compete against each other, with Sports Illustrated once comparing their rivalry to that of Muhammad Ali and Joe Frazier. Since the mid-1990s, Kahn has had a World Championship rivalry with English player Patrick Barrie, with the pair contesting 16 matches up to the end of 2019.

References

1950s births
Living people
People from North Miami Beach, Florida
Massachusetts Institute of Technology alumni